Bernard Edward Mireault (born 1961) is a Canadian comic book artist and writer.

Comics critic Timothy Callahan has argued that Mireault is one of the unheralded creators who helped bring in the Modern Age of Comic Books:

Biography
Mireault was born in Marville, France, where both parents were stationed while working for the Canadian Forces. In 1963, the Mireault family moved back to Canada. Raised as an Anglophone in Rawdon, Quebec, he has been an active participant in the Montreal underground comix scene, participating in the comix jams since their early inception and contributing to local zines and underground publications. At the same time he has worked in the mainstream comics industry as an artist and colourist, as well as an animator and illustrator.

Among his comics works are Dr. Robot, Mackenzie Queen, Bug-eyed Monster, The Blair Witch Chronicles, and Left Alone: The Rustin Parr Killings, Two Fisted Science: Safecracker, When is a Door? The Tragic Though Amusing History of Clay Face II, and the creator-owned comic The Jam, first published as a backup feature in Northguard from Matrix Graphic Series, and then published in its own title from 1985 by various publishers starting with Matrix Graphic Series and then Comico, Slave Labor Graphics, Tundra Publishing, Dark Horse Comics, and Caliber Press.

Mireault also served as the artist on the story arc The Devil Within for Matt Wagner's Grendel comics in the late 1980s – notably coloured by Joe Matt. Mireault also coloured several Grendel story arcs: Warchild, Devil's Hammer, Devil in Our Midst, Devil Tracks, Devil Eyes, Devil by the Deed, The Devil's Apprentice.

As a colourist he had a long-standing collaborative relationship with Salgood Sam a.k.a. Max Douglas, a fellow Canadian artist. Together they worked on Wonder Woman Vs. the Red Menace, Muties #6: The Patriot Game, and Revolution on the Planet of the Apes.

Another long-standing collaborative relationship has been with Mike Allred, with whom he's produced Madman Jam: The Fall of the House of Escher, Creatures of the Id, and The Everyman.  And Mireault's character Dr. Robot first appeared as a back-up in the back of Mike Allred's Madman.

Mireault also has a part-time band called Bug-Eyed Monster, for which he writes the occasional song.

Bibliography
 Mackenzie Queen
 The Jam
 Dr. Robot

Awards
Mireault was inducted into the Canadian Comic Book Creator Hall of Fame as part of the Joe Shuster Awards in 2020.

Notes

References

Bernie Mireault at the Lambiek Comiclopedia

External links
 https://web.archive.org/web/20120628012449/http://bem.spiltink.org/
 Article announcing Mireault signing with Kitchen, Lind & Associates 

Living people
1961 births
Canadian comics creators